Angel Time is a novel by American author Anne Rice released on October 27, 2009.  The book is the first in Rice's Songs of the Seraphim series, which tells the story of Toby O'Dare, an assassin with a tragic past.  The author's inspiration for the book, and the primary setting for the beginning of the story, is the Mission Inn in Riverside, California, a large historic Mission Revival style hotel.  The book debuted on the November 15, 2009 New York Times Bestseller list at #13.

Television adaptation
It was announced in late September 2013 that American network CBS will adapt the novel into a television series. Rice herself will serve as an executive producer for the project along with Carl Beverly and Sarah Timberman. The project will be produced under their production company, Timberman-Beverly Prods., and is to be written by Josh Harto and Liz Garcia.

As of September 2021, there has been no progress on the development of the book, which is likely due to the fact that AMC and Rice are producing an upcoming major television series for Interview with the Vampire.

See also

"Æviternity", the Scholastic concept of "Angel Time"

References

External links
These Days, Anne Rice Prefers Angels Interview at NPR.
Q&A with Anne Rice on 'Angel Time by Jennifer Dean with The Press-Enterprise.

2009 American novels
Novels by Anne Rice
Alfred A. Knopf books
Culture of Riverside, California
Novels set in California
Novels set in hotels